Telve may refer to:

 Telve, municipality in Trentino in the northern Italian region Trentino-Alto Adige/Südtirol
 Telve, an island on the Baltic Sea 
 Telve di Sopra, municipality in Trentino in the northern Italian region Trentino-Alto Adige/Südtirol